Porphyrosela neodoxa is a moth of the family Gracillariidae. It is known from Bihar, India.

The larvae feed on Cajanus cajan, Cajanus indicus, Desmodium, Rhynchosia species (including Rhynchosia minima). They probably mine the leaves of their host plant.

References

Lithocolletinae
Moths of Asia
Moths described in 1916